Diplacus tricolor is a species of monkeyflower known by the common name tricolor monkeyflower. It is native to Oregon and California. It grows in seasonally wet habitats such as meadows and vernal pools, including those in the San Joaquin Valley and near north coast oak woodlands. It was formerly known as Mimulus tricolor.

Description
Diplacus tricolor is an annual herb growing up to about 14 centimeters in maximum height. The oppositely arranged, lightly hairy leaves are widely lance-shaped and up to about 4.5 centimeters long. The flower corolla may be up to 5 centimeters long, its narrow tubular base emerging from an uneven calyx of sepals. The wide mouth of the flower is deep pink in color with a white and yellow blotched throat and a large maroon spot at the base of each of the five lobes.

References

External links
Jepson Manual Treatment —- Mimulus tricolor
USDA Plants Profile: Mimulus tricolor
Mimulus tricolor —- Photo gallery

tricolor
Flora of California
Flora of Oregon
Natural history of the Central Valley (California)
Plants described in 1849
Flora without expected TNC conservation status